Noakhali Government Women's College is a public college in Noakhali, Bangladesh established in 1970. In 2015, the Higher Secondary Certificate (HSC) pass rate of students at the college was 68.1%.

References

External links
 Noakhali Government Mohila College - last updated 2012

Colleges in Noakhali District
Women's universities and colleges in Bangladesh
1970 establishments in East Pakistan
Educational institutions established in 1970